Jodie White may refer to:

 Jodie-Anne White (1967–2012), Australian dancer, choreographer and artistic director
 Jodie White (footballer) (born 1980), Australian rules footballer